Hathor 13 - Coptic Calendar - Hathor 15 

The fourteenth day of the Coptic month of Hathor, the third month of the Coptic year. On a common year, this day corresponds to November 10, of the Julian Calendar, and November 23, of the Gregorian Calendar. This day falls in the Coptic season of Peret, the season of emergence.

Commemorations

Saints 

 The martyrdom of Officer Faros and the Six Hermits 
 The departure of Saint Martinus, the Bishop of Thrace

References 

Days of the Coptic calendar